The Captain George Dorrance House is an historic house in Foster, Rhode Island.  It is located on the west side of the road, a short way south of its junctions with Plain Woods Road, not far from the Connecticut border.  It is a -story wood-frame structure, five bays wide, with a gable roof and a large central chimney.  The main block was built c. 1720, and a leanto was added c. 1750.  It is one of the best-preserved early 18th-century houses in the state.

The house was listed on the National Register of Historic Places on March 16, 1972.

See also
National Register of Historic Places listings in Providence County, Rhode Island

References

Houses on the National Register of Historic Places in Rhode Island
Houses in Providence County, Rhode Island
Foster, Rhode Island
National Register of Historic Places in Providence County, Rhode Island